Heidi Baader-Nobs (born 5 December 1940) is a Swiss composer. She was born in Delémont, and trained as a teacher at the Ecole Normale in Delémont. She later studied composition and music theory with Robert Suter and Jacques Wildberger at the Basle Musik-Akademie.
 
She settled in Allschwil, married and had three children. She interrupted her career to meet her family responsibilities, but later returned to composing.

Works
Selected works include:
Duo (1986)
Bifurcation for tuba and piano

References

1940 births
Living people
20th-century classical composers
Women classical composers
Swiss classical composers
20th-century women composers
20th-century Swiss composers